The 2012 San Jose State Spartans football team represented San Jose State University in the 2012 NCAA Division I FBS football season. The Spartans were led by third year head coach Mike MacIntyre and played their home games at Spartan Stadium. They were members of the Western Athletic Conference.  This was the Spartans' final season as members of the WAC. They joined the Mountain West Conference on July 1, 2013. They finished the season 11–2, 5–1 in WAC play to finish in second place. They were invited to the Military Bowl where they defeated Bowling Green.

Head coach Mike MacIntyre resigned at the end of the regular season to take the head coach position at Colorado. Defensive coordinator Kent Baer was the Spartans' interim head coach for the Military Bowl. San Diego head coach Ron Caragher was hired as the Spartans new head coach beginning in 2013.

Personnel

Coaching staff
Head coach Mike MacIntyre returned for his third season with San Jose State. Under MacIntyre, San Jose State went 1–12 in its 2010 season and improved to 5–7 in 2011.

On December 10, the University of Colorado at Boulder hired MacIntyre to be the new head coach of the Colorado Buffaloes football team. With a five-year, $10 million contract, MacIntyre would annually earn nearly quadruple his annual salary at San Jose State. The following day, San Jose State named defensive coordinator Kent Baer to be interim coach for the 2012 Military Bowl on December 27, in which they defeated Bowling Green 29–20. The previous week, MacIntyre stated that although other schools had contacted him about potential job openings, MacIntyre was not actively seeking another job. During San Jose State's late-season win streak, speculation occurred that MacIntyre might become head coach at Cal or Kentucky in 2013.

Departing starters
San Jose State lost 12 starters from the 2011 season, including quarterback Matt Faulkner, running back Brandon Rutley, safety Duke Ihenacho, and placekicker Jens Alvernik. Ihenacho went on to play for the NFL's Denver Broncos as an undrafted free agent.

Returning starters

Offense

Defense

Special teams

Depth chart
Starters and backups from the final depth chart:

Final roster

Schedule
The 2012 schedule was officially released on March 5, 2012. The schedule had six home games and six road games. Because the WAC had only seven football member schools by 2012 due to conference realignment, San Jose State played six conference games and six non-conference games for the season. San Jose State played against all six other WAC member schools: Idaho, Louisiana Tech, New Mexico State, Texas State, UTSA, and Utah State. The non-conference games were against: Colorado State and San Diego State of the Mountain West Conference, Stanford of the Pac-12 Conference, UC Davis of the Big Sky Conference, and FBS independent schools BYU and Navy.

On November 3, San Jose State became bowl eligible for the first time since 2008 after beating Idaho and attaining six wins against FBS schools. However, the win over UTSA did not count, because UTSA was not yet a full FBS member school.

Six games were nationally televised this season. ESPN showed the Military Bowl on December 27, ESPN2 showed the games against BYU and Louisiana Tech, CBS Sports Network showed the game against Navy, and Pac-12 Network showed the game against Stanford. WatchESPN also streamed the games shown on ESPN and ESPN2 as well as two games—the ones against Colorado State and UTSA—broadcast by ESPN3, the game against New Mexico State via New Mexico State's AggieVision network, and the game against Utah State via ESPN Regional Television.

KLIV in San Jose served as the flagship station for the San Jose State Spartans Football Radio Network, along with fellow affiliates KION in Salinas and newcomer KFIV in Modesto. Michael Spero returned for his second season as play-by-play announcer, with Kevin Richardson at color commentary.

Game summaries

at Stanford

Scoring for Stanford: S. Taylor 1-yard run, J. Nunes' 11-yard pass to D. Terrell, J. Williamson 46-yard and 20-yard field goal. Scoring for San Jose State: Austin Lopez 38-yard field goal, Blake Jurich 3-yard run, and David Fales' 21-yard pass to Noel Grigsby.

UC Davis

Colorado State

at San Diego State

at Navy

Utah State

In San Jose State's homecoming game, San Jose State lost to eventual WAC champion Utah State. Although David Fales completed 38 of 50 passes for 467 yards and three touchdowns, Fales was sacked 13 times with a cumulative loss of 102 yards. Utah State also had a 212–4 advantage in rushing yards.

at UTSA

Texas State

at Idaho

at New Mexico State

BYU

Louisiana Tech

Bowling Green–Military Bowl

Ranking movements

On November 25, San Jose State made the No. 24 spot in the Bowl Championship Series (BCS) Top 25 rankings. This was San Jose State's first-ever BCS ranking and first national ranking since 1990. The following week, both the AP Poll and Coaches' Poll ranked San Jose State No. 24. This ranking marked San Jose State's first top-25 AP ranking since 1975. San Jose State also played its first bowl game since the 2006 New Mexico Bowl. On December 27, San Jose State defeated Bowling Green in the 2012 Military Bowl at Washington, D. C. by the score of 29–20.  For the first time in school history, San Jose State made it into the final rankings in both the AP and USA Today Coaches Polls, earning a No. 21 ranking in both.

After the season

Awards
Conference
Travis Johnson earned the WAC Defensive Player of the Year award. With 16 honorees, San Jose State led all WAC teams in 2012 for All-WAC honors. Named to the All-WAC first team were Noel Grigsby, Ryan Otten, Nicholas Kaspar, David Quessenberry, Travis Johnson, Travis Raciti, Vince Buhagiar, Keith Smith, and Bené Benwikere. Named to the All-WAC second team were Chandler Jones, David Fales, De'Leon Eskridge, Anthony Larceval, David Tuitupou, Austin Lopez, and Tyler Ervin.

National
Travis Johnson was invited to the East-West Shrine Game and was named to the Academic All-America second team. Johnson, Ryan Otten, and David Quessenberry all got Senior Bowl invitations.

NFL Draft

In the 2013 NFL Draft, David Quessenberry was selected in the sixth round and 176th overall by the Houston Texans.

Conference change
On July 1, 2013, San Jose State officially became a member of the Mountain West Conference (MWC). San Jose State football followed fellow WAC school Utah State to the MWC and reunited with Hawaii in football only and Boise State, Fresno State, Nevada, and several other fellow former WAC schools in football and many other sports. The WAC stopped sponsoring football after the 2012 season.

References
General:

Specific:

External links

San Jose State
San Jose State Spartans football seasons
Military Bowl champion seasons
San Jose State Spartans football